Oleg Alexandrovich Maskaev (born 2 March 1969) is a Russian-American former professional boxer who competed from 1995 to 2013, and held the WBC heavyweight title from 2006 to 2008.

Amateur career
Maskayev, a former mine worker, began his boxing career in the 1980s as an amateur in his hometown Abay. In 1991 he stopped future WBC world champion Vitali Klitschko in the second round. 

Maskayev was the champion of the Soviet Army and later the national cup winner. First he represented Soviet Union and subsequently Uzbekistan. Representing Uzbekistan he won a gold medal at the 1994 Asian Games.

Highlights 
 X Summer Spartakiad of Peoples of the USSR, boxing (+91 kg), Minsk, Belarus SSR, July 1991:
 1/2: Defeated Vitali Klitschko (Ukrainian SSR) RSC 2
 Finals: Lost to Nikolay Kulpin (Kazakh SSR)

 VIII Military Spartakiad of the Friendly Armies of the Socialist Countries (+91 kg), Kiskunfelegyhaza, Hungary, October 1990:
 Finals: Defeated János Sulyok (Hungary) walkover

USA−USSR Middle & Heavy Duals (+91 kg), Camp Lejeune, North Carolina, December 1991:
 Defeated Samson Poʻuha (United States) RSC 2

World Championships (+91 kg), Tampere, Finland May 1993:
 1/16: Defeated Zourab Sarsania (Georgia) DQ 3
 1/8: Defeated Oleksandr Litvin (Ukraine) RSC 2
 1/4: Lost to Roberto Balado (Cuba) KO 3
 World Cup (+91 kg), Bangkok, Thailand, June 1994:
 1/8: Defeated Raj Kumar Sangwan (India) 11–3 (4 rds)
 1/4: Defeated Arshak Avartakyan (Armenia) 12–6 (4 rds)
 1/2: Defeated Willi Fischer (Germany) RSC 1
 Finals: Lost to Roberto Balado (Cuba) walkover

 Asian Games (+91 kg), Hiroshima, Japan, October 1994:
 1/2: Defeated Raj Kumar Sangwan (India) RSC 2
 Finals: Defeated Mohamed Reza Kalkh Samadi (Iran) RSC 2

Maskayev resumed the amateur career within a month after his reported professional debut in April 1993, to participate in the 1993 World Championships, '94 World Cup, and '94 Asian Games, with the last ones ended with a gold medal for him.

Maskayev finished his amateur career having 118 fights under his belt, with a stated record of 108–10. Controversy later arose as to his record, before he fought Oliver McCall, USBA stated his professional record 15–0 (12 KOs,) which was confirmed ex officio by the Virginia Boxing Commission (which sanctioned the Maskayev–McCall event and all subsequent official information related to it, including the records,) while later and supposedly more precise estimates gave 6–0 (3 KOs.) Nine missing bouts in given record were either unaccounted for (and therefore non-sanctioned events,) or considered as amateur, or exhibition fights. No data available presently for that missing part of Maskayev's early professional career.

Professional career
Maskaev's professional boxing career began in 1993. Not wasting any time, he made his professional debut against 21–0 (15) former bronze medalist Alexander Miroshnichenko. Maskaev won via third-round TKO. In only his seventh professional bout, Maskaev was faced off against Oliver McCall, who had captured a world heavyweight title by knocking out Lennox Lewis only a year before. Maskaev was caught with a hard left hand to the body, followed up with a short right hand in the first round, losing via TKO and being handed his first professional defeat. After winning his next four, Maskaev fought hard-hitting Samoan David Tua. Maskayev lost via 11th-round TKO.

Oleg is known for his powerful right-hand punch: he has knocked out former WBO heavyweight challenger Derrick Jefferson, contender Alex Stewart, and twice knocked out former WBC heavyweight champion Hasim Rahman. However, he is also noted for a weak chin that was evident in his knockout losses to contenders Oliver McCall, David Tua, Kirk Johnson, Lance Whitaker, Corey Sanders and journeyman Nagy Aguilera.

His most famous victories have been his two wins over Hasim Rahman. Maskaev knocked Rahman off balance, sending his rival out of the ring in the 8th round on November 6, 1999. This fight is also notable for the famous "chair incident", in which noted referee, Steve Smoger, who was backup referee for this fight, was struck in the head by a chair thrown by a fan who was later arrested.

He later fought Rahman again and defeated him for the WBC heavyweight title by knocking him out in the 12th round on August 12, 2006. His second win over Rahman was preceded by a streak of victories that helped rejuvenate Maskaev's career and earned him the "Comeback fighter of the Year" award in The Ring magazine in 2006.

Maskaev won his first title defense against Peter Okhello on December 10, 2006 by unanimous decision.

Maskaev fought against Samuel Peter for the WBC Heavyweight title on March 8, 2008 and was doing well in the early rounds, despite Peter's repeated rabbit punching and the referee's warnings. In the 5th round Maskaev landed some of his best shots on his opponents chin, but to no avail: Peter was seemingly unaffected, visibly shaking Oleg. He lost 5 of the 6 rounds, with Peter winning by TKO with 3 seconds remaining in the sixth round.

In late 2008 he beat opponent Robert Hawkins by UD after 10 rounds and then defeated but unheralded Rich Boruff on March 14, 2009 via first-round KO, giving him mandatory contender status to the WBC Heavyweight Championship. He fought Nagy Aguilera on December 11 in Sacramento, California at the Memorial Auditorium in a tune up fight, but was knocked out in the first round. Getting stunned with an overhand right-left hook combo and knocked down soon after, another barrage by Aquilera hit Maskaev hard knocking him out.
Maskaev did not land a punch in the fight, and has since stated that he may retire following the loss, however he returned to the ring 3 years after the loss, to knock out Owen Beck. In 2013, he decisioned Jason Gavern in a 10-round fight.

Nationality
Maskayev was born in Taraz, Kazakhstan (then part of the USSR) to Mordvin parents and raised in Uzbekistan. He has lived in the U.S. since 1999 with his wife, Svetlana, and four daughters. He acquired US citizenship in 2004. He currently resides in West Sacramento, California, after previously living in Staten Island, New York. Before his second encounter with Hasim Rahman in 2006, he said "I would say I'm a proud Russian-American. So right now, I'm a citizen of America, of [the] United States... Whoever is going to win is going to be American."
In the run-up to his title defense against Peter Okhello, he stated regarding his citizenship: "Russian. I don't want to talk about that anymore. I will walk to the ring under the Russian flag and Russian anthem as I'm now a Russian citizen."
Russian president Vladimir Putin granted him Russian citizenship on December 9, 2006.

Professional boxing record

References

External links

 BoxingRecords

Boxers from California
World Boxing Council champions
1969 births
Living people
People from Taraz
Mordvin people
People from Karaganda Region
Sportspeople from Staten Island
Asian Games medalists in boxing
Russian male boxers
Uzbekistani male boxers
Boxers at the 1994 Asian Games
American male boxers
World heavyweight boxing champions
Naturalised citizens of Russia
Asian Games gold medalists for Uzbekistan
Super-heavyweight boxers
Medalists at the 1994 Asian Games
Boxers from New York City